Roy A. Somlyo (September 2, 1925 – January 29, 2009) was a prolific producer and manager of theater productions on Broadway, London, and on tours around the world.

He had production roles in the telecast of the annual Tony Awards for fourteen years, winning four Emmy Awards and garnering three more nominations.

References

External links
 Playbill obituary of Roy A. Somlyo
 Roy Somlyo papers, 1959-2007, held by the Billy Rose Theatre Division, New York Public Library for the Performing Arts

1925 births
2009 deaths
American theatre managers and producers
Deaths from cancer in New York (state)
Wayne State University alumni